The Attorney General of Ireland is a constitutional officer who is the legal adviser to the Government and is therefore the chief law officer of the State. The attorney general is not a member of the Government but does participate in cabinet meetings when invited and attends government meetings. The current attorney general is Rossa Fanning, SC.

Overview
The office and functions of the attorney general are outlined in Article 30 of the Constitution of Ireland.

The attorney general has always been a barrister rather than a solicitor, although this is not a requirement for the post. In cases where a barrister nominated by the Taoiseach to be the attorney general was not a senior counsel at the time, the government of the day has made them one first, as occurred in the cases of John Rogers BL and John M. Kelly BL.

The attorney general advises the Government on the constitutionality of bills and treaties, and presents the Government's case if the President refers any bill to the Supreme Court under Article 26 of the Constitution before signing it.

The attorney general has few prosecution duties; these are limited to functions under the various Fisheries Acts and Extradition Acts. Instead, the Director of Public Prosecutions has responsibility for all other criminal prosecutions in the State.

The Office of the Attorney General, is made up of a number of different offices:

 The Attorney General's Office (located at Merrion Street, Dublin 2) containing the advisory counsel to the attorney general (providing legal advice)
 The Office of the Parliamentary Counsel (also located at Merrion Street, Dublin 2) containing the Parliamentary Counsel who draft legislation and have responsibilities in the area of Statute Law revision
 The Chief State Solicitor's Office (located at Little Ship Street, Dublin 8) containing the solicitors representing the Attorney and the State who provide litigation, conveyancing and other transactional services
 The Statute Law Revision Unit which simplifies and improves the body of statute law

Part of the attorney general's function has been to support the Law Reform Commission's Statue Law Revision Programme, which reviews all legislation passed before independence to investigate which laws are obsolete and may be repealed, and which should be kept.  This includes laws of the United Kingdom of Great Britain and Ireland, Britain, England, and the Irish Parliament. For example, the killing of cattle in Dublin is still regulated, in part by an Irish act of 1743, while the "Treatment of Foreign Merchants" is governed by 25 Edw. 1 Magna Carta c. 30, an act of the Parliament of England dated 1297.

History
The Ministers and Secretaries Act 1924 provided a legislative basis for the Attorney-General of the Irish Free State. This act provided it with:

It also transferred the following bodies to the office of the Attorney-General:
Chief Crown Solicitor for Ireland.
Chief State Solicitor's Department and all local State Solicitors.
Treasury Solicitor for Ireland.
Parliamentary Draftsman.
Charities.
Estates of illegitimate deceased persons.

Article 30 of the Constitution of Ireland approved on 1 July 1937 established the position of Attorney General of Ireland, providing it with a constitutional basis for the first time. Article 59 provided that the attorney general of Saorstát Éireann before the coming into operation of the Constitution would become the attorney general on the coming into operation of the Constitution without the need for an appointment, which occurred on 29 December 1937.

Until 1974, the attorney general was responsible for the prosecution of criminal offences. In 1974, the position of Director of Public Prosecutions was established. Local state solicitors were transferred to the Director of Public Prosecutions in 2007.

Other functions
Two less well known but significant roles played by all Irish Attorneys General to date are as the "leader of the Irish Bar" and as a Bencher of the King's Inns. The acceptance by Attorneys General of these non-statutory and often secretive roles upon taking office throughout the years has been questioned and criticised as inappropriate for a Constitutional office-holder. In 1990, the Irish Government's Fair Trade Commission stated that "[w]e have recommended that the Bar Council should be the primary disciplinary body for barristers, and it does not include any members of the judiciary. The Attorney General is, however, a member of the Bar Council, and the Commission believes that it is preferable that he should not be involved when the Bar Council is exercising its disciplinary function. The Attorney General is also a member of the Council of King's Inns, and the Commission believes it to preferable that he should not participate in any disciplinary activity pursued by that body either. Indeed, in general, we find the membership of these bodies by the Attorney General to be somewhat anomalous."

List of attorneys general

Notes

See also
Politics of the Republic of Ireland

References

External links
Office of the Attorney General
Irish Statute Book, produced by the Office of the Attorney General

Politics of the Republic of Ireland
Prosecution